Svetlana Mikhaylovna Kaykan (born 6 August 1978 in Chelyabinsk) is a Russian speed skater  who specializes in sprint. She competed at both the 2002 Winter Olympics and the 2010 Winter Olympics.

References

External links
 

1978 births
Living people
Olympic speed skaters of Russia
Sportspeople from Chelyabinsk
Russian female speed skaters
Speed skaters at the 2002 Winter Olympics
Speed skaters at the 2010 Winter Olympics
21st-century Russian women